Alexander Rumyantsev or Aleksander Rumyantsev may refer to:

Alexander Rumyantsev (nobleman) (1677–1749), Russian nobleman and assistant of Peter the Great
Alexander Rumyantsev (minister) (born 1945), Russian minister
Alexander Rumyantsev (politician) (born 1947), Russian politician
Alexander Rumyantsev (speed skater) (born 1986), Russian speed skater